Santa Maria High School, also abbreviated as  SMHS, is a public high school located in Santa Maria, Texas (USA). It is the sole high school in the Santa Maria Independent School District. In 2015, the school was rated "Met Standard" by the Texas Education Agency.

Athletics
The Santa Maria Cougars compete in the following sports:

Basketball
Cross Country
Football
Golf
Tennis
Track and Field
Volleyball

References

External links 
 Official website

High schools in Cameron County, Texas
Public high schools in Texas